Faiz Muhammad Zikria (1892 – 1979) was an Afghan politician. He was the counselor of Foreign Service in 1921 and was also acting Minister of Education from 1923 to 1924 became Minister for Education 1924 to 1927. He was later Minister for Foreign Affairs 1929–1938, became Ambassador to Turkey from 1938–1948, Ambassador at the court of St James's 1949–1950 and to Saudi Arabia 1955–1960. He retired in 1960 and emigrated to the USA in 1964. He was also a noted poet and writer. He died in the USA, in 1979 and was buried in Peshawar.

Personal life
As being descendants of royal blood line of Mohammad Zai dynasty, he had two wives, eight sons and four daughters. His sons are Faiz Ahmad Zikria, famous Dari poet, composer and musician Fazel Ahmad Khan Nainawaz, Amir Ahmad Zikria, Habib Ahmad Zikria, Bashir Ahmad Zikria, Najib Ahmad Zikria, and Zia Ahmad Zikria.  His five daughters include Fereshta Zikria, Fakhria Zikria, Afifa Zikria and Maliha Zikria.

References

1879 births
1979 deaths
Education ministers of Afghanistan
Foreign ministers of Afghanistan
Ambassadors of Afghanistan to the United Kingdom
Ambassadors of Afghanistan to Turkey
Ambassadors of Afghanistan to Saudi Arabia